Anthony Peter Barill is an American politician from the state of West Virginia. A member of the Democratic Party, Barill is a member of the West Virginia House of Delegates, representing the 51st district.

Barill was born and raised in Star City, West Virginia. He served as the Magistrate of Monongalia County, West Virginia, from 1980 through 1997. From 1997 through 2001, Barill was the County Sheriff. He was first elected to the West Virginia House of Delegates in 2010.

In January 2014, Barill was struck by a bullet in his ankle when his son, Brad, committed suicide by firearm.

References

External links

Living people
People from Monongalia County, West Virginia
Democratic Party members of the West Virginia House of Delegates
West Virginia sheriffs
21st-century American politicians
Year of birth missing (living people)